Francis Fleming was a British colonial administrator.

Francis or Frank Fleming may also refer to:

 Francis Fleming (MP) (died 1558), MP for Lyme Regis and Southampton
 Francis P. Fleming (1841–1908), governor of Florida
 Frank Fleming (association footballer) (born 1945), English footballer for Darlington
 Frank Fleming (Australian footballer) (1907–1963), Australian rules footballer for Fitzroy
 Frank Fleming (baseball) (1919–1989), American baseball player
 Frank Fleming (politician) (died 2022), member of the Montana House of Representatives
 Frank Fleming (racing driver) (born 1959), American race car driver
 Frank Fleming (sculptor), American sculptor
 Frank Fleming (sportswriter), American sportswriter and podcaster
 Frank Fleming (Gaelic footballer) (active 1950s), Gaelic football player for Mayo
 Frank J. Fleming, American columnist, author and satirist